Gracilidris pombero is a species of ant in the genus Gracilidris. Described by Wild and Cuezzo in 2006, the species is endemic to the South American countries of Argentina, Brazil and Paraguay.

Etymology
In Guarani mythology, Pombero is a mythical humanoid creature that is nocturnal, and this is a reference to the ants nocturnal behaviour.

References

External links

Dolichoderinae
Hymenoptera of South America
Insects described in 2006